Calantica is a genus of flowering plants in the family Salicaceae. It contains 10 species of shrubs and trees endemic to Madagascar, seven of which are threatened. Calantica is closely related to the pantropical and diverse genus Homalium, from which it differs in having a superior ovary, instead of a semi-inferior ovary. The genus is also similar to Bivinia in its superior ovary but has numerous stamens and long spiciform inflorescences.

List of species
Calantica biseriata H.Perrier
Calantica capuronii Sleumer
Calantica cerasifolia (Vent.) Tul.
Calantica chauvetiae Sleumer
Calantica decaryana H.Perrier
Calantica grandiflora Jaub. ex Tul.
Calantica lucida Scott-Elliot
Calantica olivacea Appleq., Phillipson & G.E.Schatz
Calantica pseudobiseriata Appleq., Phillipson & G.E.Schatz
Calantica sphaerocephala Appleq., Phillipson & G.E.Schatz

References

Salicaceae
Endemic flora of Madagascar
Salicaceae genera